Acheilognathus polyspinus is a species of ray-finned fish in the genus Acheilognathus. It is endemic to Vietnam.

References

Acheilognathus
Fish described in 1972
Fish of Vietnam

Endemic fauna of Vietnam